Christopher Dillon O'Brien (1848–1922) was an Irish-American lawyer and politician.

Biography
O'Brien was born to a Catholic family in County Galway, Ireland, December 4, 1848. His father, novelist Dillon O'Brien (1817–1882), emigrated to the US, working as a teacher among Native Americans in the Wisconsin town of La Pointe, on Madeline Island before settling his family in St Paul, Minnesota in 1863 to work with Archbishop John Ireland, helping establish many Irish Catholic colonies in the state.

O'Brien passed the bar in 1870. He married Susan E. Slater in October 1872, and they had eight children.

A Democrat, he was elected county attorney of Ramsey County, Minnesota in 1874, and served as the mayor of Saint Paul from 1883 to 1885. O'Brien died at his home in Saint Paul on August 27, 1922.

See also
 List of mayors of Saint Paul

References

 Political Graveyard - O'Brien, Christopher D. (1848-1922) — of St. Paul, Ramsey County, Minn.
 Mayors of St. Paul, Minnesota
 Minnesota History Magazine/O–Index: O'Brien, Christopher D. (lawyer, mayor); O'Brien, Dillon J. (author, colonizer, Irish immigration promotion) Minnesota Historical Society: MNHS.ORG

1848 births
1922 deaths
19th-century Irish people
Irish emigrants to the United States (before 1923)
Mayors of Saint Paul, Minnesota
Minnesota Democrats
People from County Galway